Jaga Mechhida Maga is a 1972 Indian Kannada-language swashbuckler film directed by Hunsur Krishnamurthy and produced & written by S. Bhavanarayan. It starred Rajkumar and Bharathi. Satyam scored and composed the music to the lyrics written by Hunsur Krishnamurthy.

Plot 
Blinded by an astrologer's prediction, a King suspecting his wife's fidelity banishes her and their infant son, Aaditya. Years later a grown up Aaditya happens to fall in love with Princess Yamini and later saves honest Minister Mahadeva Sharma after he is framed for attempting to murder the King by the antagonists. In the process he is declared an outlaw by the King.

Cast 
 Rajkumar as Aditya, King's son
 Bharathi as Yamini, Princess
 Narasimharaju
 M. P. Shankar as Rudrasimha
 K. S. Ashwath as King
 M. V. Rajamma as Kausalyadevi, Queen
 Rajasulochana as Dancer
 Rajanand
 B. Jaya
 Shakti Prasad

Soundtrack 
The music of the film was composed by Satyam and the lyrics were written by Hunsur Krishnamurthy. The song "Yeri Mele Yeri" was received extremely well and considered as one of the evergreen songs.

Track list

See also
 Kannada films of 1972

References

External links 
 

1972 films
1970s Kannada-language films
Indian black-and-white films
Indian drama films
Films scored by Satyam (composer)
1972 drama films
Films directed by Hunsur Krishnamurthy